The brain sponge (Isodictya elastica) is a species of marine demosponge in the family Isodictyidae. This sponge is known from the west coast of South Africa to Port Elizabeth. It is endemic to this region.

Description 
The brain sponge may grow to 20 cm across. It has a smooth surface, covered with many scattered oscula. It may be beige to pink in colour and grows in two forms:  one massive and convoluted, rather like a brain, and the other with narrowing fingers. Its texture is soft and compressible.

Habitat 
This sponge lives on rocky reefs subtidally to 25m.

References

Poecilosclerida
Sponges described in 1880